The Radolfzeller Aach (also known as Hegauer Aach) is a right or north tributary of the Rhine in the south of Baden-Württemberg (Germany). It is approximately 32 km long.

Course 
The source of the river is the Aachtopf in Aach, the largest spring in Germany, at a height of 475 m above sea level.  The water emerges from a karst cave.  About two thirds of the water originates in the headwaters of the Danube.  Between Immendingen and Möhringen an der Donau and in Fridingen, water from the Danube disappears underground (this is known as the Danube Sinkhole); this water reappears in the Aachtopf.

The river first flows through a number of nature reserves in the Hegau area.  This segment of the river is known as Hegauer Aach.  It then flows South to Singen, where it is known as Radolfzeller Aach.  The last six kilometers of the lower course flow through a nature reserve called Radolfzeller Aach Ried.  It flows into the northwestern part of Lake Untersee (the Zellersee) between Radolfzell and Moos.  At the mouth, the average discharge is 10 m3/s, making it the fourth largest contributor to Lake Constance.

Catchment area 
The Radolfzeller Aach drains a watershed of 255 km2.  If one includes the catchment area of the Danube upstream of the Donauversinkung, then the Radolfzell Aach drains an area of 1560 km2 on days when all of the Danube's water disappears into the Danube Sinkhole.

Hydrology 
In the past, the fast flowing water of the Radolfzeller Aach drove many watermills. Today, it drives several hydropower stations.  In some areas, nature restoration projects are being carried out, for example in Beuren an der Aach, where the borough of Singen has set up a sediment catching facility, catching sediments and gravel carried by the river.  Plans to release the sediments upstream of Volkertshausen were abandoned.

Fauna 
Several endangered species of waterfowl can be found at the Radolfzeller Aach, including snipe, sandpiper and green sandpiper.  In the estuary, beavers established themselves in 1998, after having been absent for 200 years.  Hydromorphologically, the Radolfzeller Aach is the lower end of trout and mullet territory.  The dominant fish species in the Aach is the brown trout, as grayling are less shy and consequently more exposed to the feeding pressure of the large cormorant colony in the Radolfzeller Aach Ried.  There are also noticeable stocks of some other endangered fish species, such as lamprey and European bullhead, who enjoy their protection close to the bottom of the river.  In the lower reaches, we also find other species from Lake Constance.

Communities 
Villages on the Radolfzeller Aach include Aach, Volkertshausen, Beuren an der Aach, Friedingen, Hausen an der Aach, Singen, Rielasingen-Worblingen, Bohlingen and the Rickelshausen district of Radolfzell.

Water sports 
Canoeing is possible all year round, due to the strong Aachtopf spring.  Canoeing in the section between Aachbad Singen and Bohlingen, however, is not advisable on account of the many water discharges and heavy industrialization.  The lower reaches of the Aach are a nature preserve and closed to water sports year round.

Footnotes 

Rivers of Baden-Württemberg
Tributaries of Lake Constance
Geography of Hegau
Rivers of Germany